NTSU may refer to:

 North Texas State University, a previous name of the University of North Texas in Texas, United States
 National Taiwan Sport University in Taoyuan City, Taiwan
 Nottingham Trent Students' Union in England
National Technical Support Unit, a unit of the DSU of the Belgian federal police